Bence Ötvös (born 13 March 1998) is a Hungarian professional footballer who plays for Kisvárda FC.

Career statistics
.

References
 
 

1998 births
Living people
People from Nyíregyháza
Hungarian footballers
Association football midfielders
Nyíregyháza Spartacus FC players
Cigánd SE players
Kisvárda FC players
Nemzeti Bajnokság I players
Sportspeople from Szabolcs-Szatmár-Bereg County